Matthew D. "Matt" Wilson is an artist whose work has appeared in role-playing games. He is one of the founders, the owner, and the CEO of Privateer Press.

Career
Matt Wilson started as an artist with Alderac Entertainment Group around 1995, and worked there as an art director before also doing art direction for companies Wizards of the Coast and FASA. Wilson and his friend Brian Snoddy formed Privateer Press with writer Matt Staroscik to publish their own d20 supplements. Wilson and Snoddy produced the covers and interior art for Privateer's first adventures published in 2001.

His artwork for D&D has been featured in A Darkness Gathering (1998), Forgotten Realms Campaign Setting (2001), Faiths and Pantheons (2002), and Unapproachable East (2003).

References

External links
 
 

American artists
Indie role-playing game designers
Living people
Place of birth missing (living people)
Role-playing game artists
Role-playing game designers
Year of birth missing (living people)